The Willis Barnstone Translation Prize is an annual award given to an exceptional translation of a poem from any language into English. The prize was inaugurated in 2002 by the University of Evansville, and has been presented annually since 2003. The award is given in honor of the distinguished poet and translator, Willis Barnstone, and Dr. Barnstone has served each year as the contest's final judge.  The distinction comes with a cash prize of USD $1,000, and the winning poem or poems are published in The Evansville Review. After the retirement of Dr. William Baer in 2015, Dr. Tiffany Griffith, professor at the University of Evansville, became the director of the competition.

Winners

References

External links
 The Evansville Review
Willis Barnstone Translation Prize Website

Translation awards
American literary awards
Lists of writers by award
University of Evansville
Awards established in 2003
2003 establishments in Indiana